All Over the World is the first major label studio album by JJ Weeks Band. Inpop Records released the album on March 26, 2013. JJ Weeks Band worked with JJ Weeks and Scotty Wilbanks, in the production of this album.

Critical reception

Awarding the album an eight out of ten for Cross Rhythms, Tony Cummings writes, "impressive set". Sarah Fine, giving the album four stars at New Release Tuesday, states, "Meaningful and full of heart, this is an album well worth the investment." Rating the album a 4.25 out of five from Christian Music Zine, Joshua Andre says, "JJ Weeks Band have recorded a stellar debut". Jonathan Andre, signaling in a three star review by Indie Vision Music, describes, "Well done guys for an enjoyable album!"

Track listing

References

2013 albums
Inpop Records albums